The Patriarchal Order of the Holy Cross of Jerusalem is a Catholic honorific lay order and ecclesiastical decoration established in 1979 by Patriarch Maximos V Hakim of the Melkite Greek Catholic Church, with its seat in the Old City of Jerusalem. It aims to promote Catholic faith and to support religious, cultural and social works of the Melkite Greek Catholic Church in the Holy Land, as well as to promote its Byzantine liturgy. Its current Grand Master is Patriarch Youssef Absi, and its Grand Prior is the Vicar Apostolic of Jerusalem.

The symbol of the order is a gold-edged cross with a red or blue interior. Prominent feast days include Saint George's Day and the Feast of the Cross.

The Patriarchal Order of the Holy Cross of Jerusalem, while completely independent of the Holy See, is under "ecclesiastical patronage" sui iuris by the Melkite Catholic Patriarchate of Antioch and All the East in accordance with the Code of Canons of the Eastern Churches. As such, it is recognised as a legitimate ecclesiastical decoration by the International Commission on Orders of Chivalry. In addition, it is a registered charity in multiple countries.

History 

The order was founded by Patriarch Maximos V Hakim of the Melkite Greek Catholic Church on 14 September 1979, originally based in Santa Maria in Cosmedin, Rome, Italy. Ever since, it has enjoyed the protection of the subsequent Patriarchs of the Melkite Greek Catholic Church as Grand Masters.

In 1997, new statutes were introduced and the seat was moved to Damascus, Syria.

Organisation 

Under the Melkite Catholic Patriarchate of Antioch and All the East as Grand Master, the order is organised by a Governor International and served by a Grand Prior, the Vicar Apostolic of Jerusalem. In consequence, local provinces are governed by Deputy Governors and served by Priors National.

The order has a seat in the Old City of Jerusalem, at the seat of the Melkite Patriarchate, yet the seat of the Grand Master is situated in Damascus, Syria, along with the seat of the Patriarch of the Melkite Greek Catholic Church.

Apart from the Middle East, the order is active in Italy (2006), Germany (1988), Belgium (1986), France (2014), United States and Canada. Among its charitable endeavours, in the United States, it runs a project called "Friend of the Holy Land" in support of Christians of the Holy Land.

Grades 
 Knight or Dame Grand Cross
 Knight or Dame Grand Officer
 Knight or Dame Commander
 Knight or Dame

Status 
The Patriarchal Order of the Holy Cross of Jerusalem, while completely independent of the Holy See, is under "ecclesiastical patronage" sui iuris by the  Melkite Catholic Patriarchate of Antioch and All the East in accordance with the Code of Canons of the Eastern Churches. As such, it is recognised as a legitimate ecclesiastical decoration by the International Commission on Orders of Chivalry and the Augustan Society. In addition, it is a registered charity in multiple countries, including Lebanon, Jordan, Egypt and Canada.

Although recognised as a legitimate ecclesiastical decoration, part of the order's terminology has been a subject of criticism by the ICOC:

Gallery

References

Bibliography 
 AA.VV., Ordine patriarcale della Santa Croce di Gerusalemme. Luogotenenza della lingua italiana. Calendario storico per il 2007; Edisiòn Il Pomerio, Lod, 2006, 
 Guy Stair Sainty and Rafal Heydel-Mankoo, Burke's Peerage & Gentry: World Orders of Knighthood and Merit, vol. II pagg. 1969–1970, Burke's Peerage, 2006,

External links 

 Official website
 Der Patriarchalische Orden vom Heiligen Kreuz zu Jerusalem (in German)

 
Religious organizations based in Israel
Organizations based in Jerusalem
Christian organizations established in 1979
Christian religious orders established in the 20th century
Christian organizations based in Asia
Organizations based in Damascus
Catholic organizations established in the 20th century
Eastern Catholic orders and societies
Eastern Catholicism in the State of Palestine